Solemya is a genus of saltwater clams, marine bivalve mollusks in the family Solemyidae, the awning clams. Solemya is the type genus of the family Solemyidae.

Description
The shell valves of species in this genus are fragile and subcylindrical in shape; there are no hinge teeth. The shell has a persistent thin periostracum which extends beyond the valve margins, hence the common name "awning clams".

These clams have chemosynthetic bacterial symbionts that produce their food. The bacteria live within their gill cells, and produce energy by oxidizing hydrogen sulfide, which they then use to fix carbon dioxide via the Calvin cycle. This symbiosis has been best-studied in the Atlantic species S. velum and the Pacific species S. reidi.

Species
Species within the genus Solemya include:
 Solemya africana
 Solemya atacama
 Solemya australis
 Solemya borealis
 Solemya elarraichensis
 Solemya flava
 Solemya moretonensis
 Solemya notialis
 Solemya occidentalis
 Solemya panamensis
 Solemya parkinsonii
 Solemya pervernicosa
 Solemya pusilla
 Solemya reidi
 Solemya tagiri
 Solemya terraereginae
 Solemya velesiana
 Solemya velum
 Solemya winkworthi

References

Solemyidae
Bivalve genera
Taxa named by Jean-Baptiste Lamarck
Chemosynthetic symbiosis